John B. Boss  (born November 23) is an American actor known for playing Roger De Bris in the national tour production of The Producers.

Filmography

Film

Theater

References 

Living people
21st-century American male actors
Year of birth missing (living people)